Famous 5: On The Case is an animated television series which was broadcast in the United Kingdom, on the Disney Channel, France 3 in France, and in the U.S., on Qubo. It is a British and French television co-production, loosely based on The Famous Five series of books created by Enid Blyton. At least some of the episodes have been developed for television by Douglas Tuber and Tim Maile, the writers of the former Disney Channel series Lizzie McGuire. On 21 June 2008, the show premiered in Italy and Australia on Disney Channel.

Plot
The central characters, children of the original Famous Five, embark on a new series of adventures. During these adventures the new Famous Five are able to make use of newer technology such as laptop computers and mobile phones which had never been invented in their parents' day.

Characters
 Jo Misra (short for Jyothi, a Hindi word meaning light.) She is a 12-year-old daughter of George Kirrin, and like her mother before her is a tomboy and prefers to shorten her name to a more masculine form. She is of Anglo-Indian heritage; her father is a man named Ravi whom George met in the Himalayas. She is voiced by Sauvane Delanoë.
 Max Kirrin - Son of Julian Kirrin. He is a 13-year-old adrenaline junkie, who enjoys sports such as mountain biking and skateboarding. He is voiced by Hervé Grull and Jon Lee in the English-language adaptation.
 Allie Campbell - A 12-year-old daughter of Anne Kirrin, who moved to California after university and is now a successful art dealer. Allie, who was born in California before moving to Falcongate, is a happy shopaholic and uses her cellphone to stay in contact with America. She is voiced by Alexandra Pic.
 Dylan Kirrin - Son of Dick Kirrin. He is an 11-year-old fan of gadgets and aspiring entrepreneur who likes to look for ways to make money. He is voiced by Lizzie Waterworth in English-language adaptation. He is voiced by Alexandre Nguyen.
 Timmy the Dog - The Famous Five's trusty pet dog.
 Dane and Blaine Dunston - they are neighbours of the Famous Five, who are the same age as them, but are spoiled, pampered and arrogant due to their father's wealth. They typically have their comeuppance whenever they appear, but have been shown to team up with the five on occasion.

Criticism
The show has attracted criticism from Blyton fans.  Vivienne Endecott, a member of the Enid Blyton Society, has said she was "wary" of the show, telling The Daily Telegraph "I don't really see how you can take the Famous Five out of their era, which is 1940s Britain; anybody can write about four children and a dog, and my concern is that modern kids who watch this will think that the Famous Five is all about gadgets and multi-culturalism."

Steve Aranguren, the vice president of global original programming at the Disney Channel, explained that "We wanted to bring the sense of adventure in the original books to a new generation of Famous Five fans, however, we needed to give the characters a contemporary voice." Jeff Norton, of Chorion Limited, the company that owns the television rights to Enid Blyton's works, told the Press Association "We tried to imagine where the original Famous Five would go in their lives." He also stated "we spoke to Enid Blyton's daughter and she thought her mother would love what we have done".

Episodes
There are 26 episodes and each episode is 22 minutes long. Six years later, it finally premiered in the U.S.

 The Case of the Fudgie Fry Pirates- 5 April 2008 (2014 in the USA)
 The Case of the Plant That Could Eat Your House- 12 April 2008 (2014 in the USA)
 The Case of the Impolite and Snarly Thing- 19 April 2008 (2014 in the USA)-Note: Dylan wears brown shorts at the start of this episode.
 The Case of the Sticks and Their Tricks- 26 April 2008 (2014 in the USA)
 The Case of the Plot to Pull the Plug- 3 May 2008 (2014 in the USA)-Note: this is the first episode to have snow in Falcongate.
 The Case of the Thief Who Drinks From the Toilet- 10 May 2008 (2014 in the USA)
 The Case of the Hot Air BA-BOOM!- 17 May 2008 (2014 in the USA)
 The Case of the Stinky Smell- 24 May 2008 (2014 in the USA)
 The Case of the Defective Detective- 31 May 2008 (2014 in the USA)
 The Case of Allies Really Bad Singing- 7 June 2008 (2014 in the USA)
 The Case of the Medieval Meathead- 14 June 2008 (2014 in the USA)
 The Case of the Messy Mucked up Masterpiece- 21 June 2008 (2014 in the USA)
 The Case of the Guy Who Makes You Act Like A Chicken- 28 June 2008 (2014 in the USA)
 The Case of the Felon with Frosty Fingers-  5 July 2008 (2014 in the USA)
 The Case of the Bogus Banknotes- 12 July 2008 (2014 in the USA)
 The Case of 8 Arms and No Fingerprints- 19 July 2008 (2014 in the USA)
 The Case of the Flowers That Make Your Body Go All Wobbly- 26 July 2008 (2014 in the USA)
 The Case of the Guy Who Looks Very Good for a 2000 Year Old- 2 August 2008 (2014 in the USA)-Note: Max wears a blue tank in this episode.
 The Case of the Gobbling Goop- 9 August 2008 (2014 in the USA)
 The Case of the Surfer Dude Who is Truly Rude- 16 August 2008 (2014 in the USA)
 The Case of the Cactus, The Coot and The Cowboy Boot- 23 August 2008 (2014 in the USA)
 The Case of the Seal Who Gets All Up in Your Face- 30 August 2008 (2014 in the USA)
 The Case of the Snow, The Glow and The OH-NO!- 6 September 2008 (2014 in the USA)
 The Case of the Fish That Flew The Coop- 13 September 2008 (2014 in the USA)
 The Case of the Smashed and Tangled Museum- 20 September 2008 (2014 in the USA)
 The Case of the Golden Medal and the Horse of Steel- 27 September 2008 (2014 in the USA)

Merchandise
Along with the series, Hodder Books has produced a "flipper" novel of some of the 26 episodes. Each book contains two of the stories and are available in UK bookstores. No other merchandise was ever released.
The books are:

 Case Files 1 & 2: The Case of the Fudgie Fry Pirates & The Case of the Plant that Could Eat Your House
 Case Files 3 & 4: The Case of the Impolite Snarly Thing & The Case of the Sticks and Their Tricks
 Case Files 5 & 6: The Case of the Plot to Pull the Plug & The Case of the Thief Who Drinks from the Toilet
 Case Files 7 & 8: The Case of the Hot-Air Ba-Boom! & The Case of the Stinky Smell
 Case Files 9 & 10: The Case of the Defective Detective & The Case of Allie's Really Very Bad Singing
 Case Files 11 & 12: The Case of the Medieval Meathead & The Case of the Messy Mucked Up Masterpiece
 Case Files 13 & 14: The Case of the Guy Who Makes You Act Like A Chicken & The Case of the Felon with Frosty Fingers
 Case Files 15 & 16: The Case of the Bogus Banknotes & The Case of Eight Arms and No Fingerprints
 Case Files 17 & 18: The Case of the Flowers That Make Your Body All Wobbly & The Case of the Guy Who Looks Pretty Good for a 2000 Year-Old
 Case Files 19 & 20: The Case of the Gobbling Goop & The Case of the Surfer Dude Who's Truly Rude
 Case Files 21 & 22: The Case of the Cactus, the Coot, and the Cowboy Boot & The Case of the Seal Who Gets All Up in Your Face
 Case Files 23 & 24: The Case of the Snow, the Glow and the Oh, No! & The Case of the Fish That Flew the Coop

International sales
According to the online magazine License! Global the series has been sold to several international broadcasters. These are Super RTL (Germany), RTBF (Belgium), the Dutch version of Jetix, and LNK (Lithuania); along with Disney France, Disney Africa, Disney Middle-East and Disney Asia and Australia.

References

External links
 Official site Disney Channel UK
 

2008 British television series debuts
2008 British television series endings
2000s British animated television series
2008 French television series debuts
2008 French television series endings
2000s French animated television series
Adaptations of works by Enid Blyton
Animated television series about children
Animated television series about dogs
British children's animated comedy television series
British children's animated fantasy television series
British children's animated mystery television series
British television shows based on children's books
French children's animated comedy television series
French children's animated fantasy television series
French children's animated mystery television series
English-language television shows
French-language television shows
Disney Channel (British and Irish TV channel) original programming
Qubo
France Télévisions children's television series
France Télévisions television comedy
French television shows based on children's books
Television series by Banijay
Television series by Disney
Television shows set in England